Remembering Me-Me is an album by saxophonist Clifford Jordan which was recorded in New York City in 1976 and first released on the Muse label.

Reception

The Allmusic site rated the album with 4 stars.

Track listing 
 "It's Time" (Max Roach) – 7:29
 "Powerful Paul Robeson" (Clifford Jordan, Hank D. Smith) – 5:51  
 "Symphony in Blues" (Roy Burrowes) – 6:15  
 "Ole Funny Columbine" (Jordan, J. Cridland) – 10:11    
 "Mama's Little Boy Thinks He's a Man" (Jordan) – 4:36
 "Me-Me (Prayer to the People)" (Jordan, Smith) – 3:30

Personnel 
Clifford Jordan – tenor saxophone
Roy Burrowes – trumpet, flugelhorn
Chris Anderson – piano, electric piano
Wilbur Ware (tracks 1, 2, 5 & 6), Kyoto Fujiwara (tracks 3 & 4) – bass
George Avaloz – drums
Hank Diamond Smith – vocals (tracks 2 & 6), percussion (track −4)
Boo Boo Monk (tracks 2 & 4), Donna Jordan (track 4), Terri Plair (track 4) – vocals

References 

Clifford Jordan albums
1977 albums
Muse Records albums